Emeka Eze may refer to:

 Emeka Christian Eze (born 1992), Nigerian footballer who plays as a midfielder
 Emeka Friday Eze (born 1996), Nigerian footballer who plays as a striker